Chiloglanis ruziziensis is a species of upside-down catfish native to Burundi, the Democratic Republic of the Congo and Rwanda where it occurs in the Ruzizi River.  This species grows to a length of  SL.

References

ruziziensis
Freshwater fish of Africa
Fish of Burundi
Fish of the Democratic Republic of the Congo
Fish of Rwanda
Taxonomy articles created by Polbot
Fish described in 1993